The Mayor of Hokitika officiated over the borough of Hokitika in New Zealand. The office was created in 1866 when Hokitika became a municipality and a borough two years later, and ceased with the 1989 local government reforms, when Hokitika Borough and Westland County merged to form Westland District. The first Mayor of Hokitika was James Bonar.

History

Hokitika was first settled by Europeans in 1864 after gold had been found on the West Coast, and it quickly became the centre of the West Coast Gold Rush. The first chairman of the municipal council was James Bonar in 1865, and this role became that of the Mayor of Hokitika in 1866. Hokitika became a municipal district of Canterbury Province on 5 June 1866, and through the Hokitika Municipal Corporation Ordinance of 1867 was designated a borough on 24 August 1868.

The second mayor was William Shaw, who successfully contested an election against Charles Button and Evan Prosser on 21 October 1867. Shaw, Button, and Prosser received 205, 193, and 130 votes, respectively. In the early years, the borough councillors usually elected a mayor from their midst, but in 1867, a local ordinance applied that gave the public the right to elect the mayor.

Councillor Prosser was elected unanimously at a council meeting on 9 September 1868 by his fellow councillors. The next election was held in December of the same year, and the Hokitika Borough came within the normal schedule of voting the mayor at the end of the year as prescribed by The Municipal Corporations Act. At the meeting on 16 December, Mayor Prosser was re-elected by the councillors. Prosser resigned during May 1869, as he had bought a pharmaceutical business in Dunedin, to where he was going to relocate; Charles Button was voted to replace him as mayor. Prosser left Hokitika during June 1869.

Button resigned the mayoralty on 15 October 1869, as he was about to leave the West Coast. The meeting was adjourned to 19 October, when Samuel Boyle was elected mayor. At the council meeting on 15 December of that year, Boyle was re-elected as mayor for the following year. At the council meeting on 21 December 1870, James Midgely Higgin was elected mayor in succession to Samuel Boyle. Higgin foreshadowed his intention to resign at the council meeting on 15 September 1871, and at the adjourned meeting on 19 September, the letter of resignation was read out, and two councillors were nominated: James B. Clarke and George Frederick Hawkins, which Clarke won by five votes to three. The local newspaper, The West Coast Times, was highly critical of the situation and the new mayor. It thought Clarke unfit to be a mayor, and impressed on their readership that anybody who they vote for as councillor might become mayor, so they should take more care when supporting candidates. At the next election for mayor on 20 December 1871, three candidates were put forward: James B. Clarke (the incumbent), Councillor John Tait, and Councillor William Todd. The voting was six, five and three votes for Clarke, Tait, and Todd, respectively, but the whole situation turned into a shambles, as it was unclear whether councillors had voted for a mayor for the next year, or whether they had eliminated one of the candidates from the list. The West Coast Times was once again being scathing about the situation, pointing out that 14 votes had been cast by 9 councillors present, hence it could not have been an election for mayor. The disagreement carried into the new year, when a majority of councillors refused to accept the minutes as a true and correct record, stating that Clarke had been re-elected as mayor. Clarke resigned as mayor and councillor on 17 January 1872, and a new mayor had to be elected. At the next council meeting on 20 January 1872, it was decided to vote for the remaining two candidates, with Todd and Tait receiving five and two votes, respectively.  Each of the candidates voted for the other.  Todd was thus declared elected.

Frederick Learmonth was elected mayor in 1878. He resigned in March 1879. John Tait and McLean Watt Jack were nominated for the resulting election, but Tait retired from the contest before the election was held and Jack was declared elected.

The regular 1879 mayoral election was held on 26 November and was contested by the incumbent, Jack, and the previous mayor Learmonth. Jack won the election with 153 votes to 96. In the next election on 24 November 1880, four candidates stood for office: former mayor Learmonth, councillor John Tait, John Peake, and John Robert Hudson. Voting was close, and Learmonth, Tait, Peake, and Hudson received 129, 110, 89, and 71 votes, respectively. There were concerns whether the preparation of a supplementary roll of electors was legal, and the matter went to court. The resident magistrate ruled on 18 December "that the whole election is void". A new election was called for 10 January 1881. Of the previous candidates, Peake did not stand again, and Learmonth, Tait, and Hudson received 149, 104, and 30 votes, respectively; Learmonth was thus once again declared elected.

List of mayors
The following is a complete list of the mayors of Hokitika:

References

Hokitika
Hokitika